Maria Sharapova was the defending champion, and successfully defended her title, defeating Jelena Janković 6–2, 4–6, 6–1 in the final.

Seeds
A champion seed is indicated in bold text while text in italics indicates the round in which that seed was eliminated. The top nine seeds received a bye to the second round.

  Maria Sharapova (champion)
  Alicia Molik (second round)
  Jelena Janković (final)
  Elena Likhovtseva (withdrew because of a left thigh injury)
  Tatiana Golovin (semifinals)
  Shinobu Asagoe (third round)
  Daniela Hantuchová (second round)
  Ai Sugiyama (third round)
  Marion Bartoli (second round)
  Nicole Vaidišová (second round)
  Virginie Razzano (second round)
  Evgenia Linetskaya (second round)
  Anna-Lena Grönefeld (first round)
  Lisa Raymond (first round)
  Maria Kirilenko (second round)
  Samantha Stosur (third round)
  María Vento-Kabchi (second round)

Draw

Finals

Top half

Section 1

Section 2

Bottom half

Section 3

Section 4

External links
 2005 DFS Classic draw

DFS Classic Singles
Singles